The 1993 World Figure Skating Championships were held in Prague (Sportovní hala), Czech Republic on March. Medals were awarded in men's singles, ladies' singles, pair skating, and ice dancing.

1993 was the first year that the ISU introduced a qualifying round for the singles events. In the qualifying events, the skaters were split into two groups, with the top 12 in each group advancing to the short program.

Medal tables

Medalists

Medals by country

Results

Men

Ladies

Pairs

Ice dancing

References

External links
 results
  
  
  
  

World Figure Skating Championships
World Figure Skating Championships
World Figure Skating Championships
Sports competitions in Prague
March 1993 sports events in Europe
1990s in Prague